Lee Pluck (born 25 March 1982) in Enfield, London, is an English retired professional footballer who played as a defender for Barnet in the Football League.

References

1982 births
Living people
Footballers from Enfield, London
English footballers
Association football defenders
Barnet F.C. players
Cambridge City F.C. players
English Football League players